Ornella Ongaro, known as "La Tulipe" because of her pink racing colours, is a French Grand Prix motorcycle racer.

Awards
Ongaro has been on the podium over fifty times, and has had over forty victories during her career. She is the only French woman to have achieved both podiums and points at regional and national championships in mixed categories. In April 2016, she won the FFM Women's Cup.

Life

Ongaro was born into a poor family in La Bocca, a suburb of Cannes, France. Her elder sister was a racing driver, so she followed in her footsteps.

Aged 6, she was given her first 50cc motorcycle by her grandmother, as a birthday present.

She had  an accident riding in the woods, which took her over a year before she wanted to get back on a bike. When she did, she started to win at various tracks in the over-6 category (the youngest age allowed legally in France to start competing), against boys of the same age and older.

Even though to outsiders she often seems a loner, she impresses them with her talent for winning.

Her parents' protectiveness made it difficult for her at the start of her career: other competitors' parents found it difficult to accept that a girl was better than their little boys. They used underhand tactics to stop her winning (blocking the brakes, the engine, or the fuel tank on her machine).

Career statistics

By season

References

External links
 Profile on motogp.com

Living people
1990 births
125cc World Championship riders
Female motorcycle racers
Sportspeople from Cannes